Al Nassr, sometimes known as Al Nassr Riyadh, is a Saudi professional basketball club based in Riyadh. The team plays in the Saudi Premier League, the national top league, as well as in the West Asia Super League (WASL). Al Nassr plays its home games in the Green Basketball Court.

History 
Founded in 1955, Al Nassr has a competing basketball team. They won their first-ever Saudi championship after winning the Saudi Premier League in 2021. The team defeated Al Wahda in the finals, winning the third and decisive game on April 18, 2021.

The same year, Al Nassr played in the Gulf Clubs Championship, the first Saudi team to play in the tournament in 10 years (the last being Al-Ittihad Jeddah in 2011).

In 2022, Al Nassr played in the inaugural season of the West Asia Super League.

Honours 
Saudi Premier League

 Champions (1): 2021

Gulf Clubs Basketball Championship

 Runners-up (1): 2021

References 

Basketball teams in Saudi Arabia
Basketball teams established in 1955
Sport in Riyadh